Lara Vukasović (born 10 November 1994) is a Croatian volleyball player. She plays as opposite for German club Ladies in Black Aachen.

References

External links
Lara Vukasović at CEV.eu

1994 births
Living people
Croatian women's volleyball players
Croatian expatriate sportspeople in France
Croatian expatriate sportspeople in Germany
Expatriate volleyball players in France
Expatriate volleyball players in Italy
Expatriate volleyball players in Romania
Expatriate volleyball players in Germany